Ottone Calderari (13 September 1730 – 26 October 1803) was an Italian architect and writer of architectural design.

Calderari was born and died in Vicenza. He made the designs for the Palazzos Loschi (Zileri dal Verme), Anti, Sola, Bonini, and Cordellina located in and near Vicenza. He helped construct the church of Santorso, province of Vicenza. His design for a facade of the church of San Marco in San Girolamo in Vicenza, was later used for the church of St. Filippo Neri by Antonio Piovene. He was active in some of the reconstruction and expansions of Thiene Cathedral. He also worked in Verona, Padua, and Marostica.
In his day, he was said to represent a rejuvenated Palladio, while by others, he was considered a plagiarist.

Sources

See also 

Palladian architecture

1730 births
1803 deaths
Architects from Vicenza
18th-century Italian architects
19th-century Italian architects
People from Vicenza
Palladian architecture